Shota Kawanishi (川西 翔太, born October 28, 1988) is a Japanese football player for Kataller Toyama.

Club statistics
Updated to end of 2018 season.

1Includes Japanese Super Cup and Promotion Playoffs to J1.

References

External links
Profile at Oita Trinita

1988 births
Living people
Osaka University of Health and Sport Sciences alumni
Association football people from Nara Prefecture
Japanese footballers
J1 League players
J2 League players
J3 League players
Gamba Osaka players
Montedio Yamagata players
Oita Trinita players
FC Gifu players
Kataller Toyama players
Association football forwards